The Singapore Open Badminton Championships is an annual badminton tournament created in 1929. The Men's Doubles was first contested in 1930. The tournament was canceled between 1942 to 1946 because of World War II and discontinued from 1974 to 1986. It returned in 1987 as Konica Cup and was held until 1999. There was no competition held in 1993, 1996 and 2000. The tournament returned in 2001 under a new sponsor. It was again canceled between 2020-2021 due to the COVID-19 pandemic. 

Below is the list of the winners at the Singapore Open in men's doubles.

History
In the Amateur Era, Ong Poh Lim (1950–1956, 1959, 1962) holds the record for the most titles in the Men's Doubles, winning Singapore Open nine times. He share the record for most consecutive titles of seven with Ismail Marjan from 1950 to 1956. The most back-to-back finals ever reached in men's doubles was also achieved by Ong when he reached 13 consecutive finals between 1950 and 1962, a record he still holds till this day.

Since the Open Era of badminton began in late 1979, Sigit Budiarto (1997–1998, 2005–2006) holds the record for the most Men's Doubles titles with four. Rexy Mainaky and Ricky Subagja (1994–1995), Sigit Budiarto and Candra Wijaya (1997–1998) and Hendra Setiawan (2012–2013) share the record for most consecutive victories with two. Sigit also managed to achieve the feat twice with his second coming in 2005–2006, when he partnered Candra Wijaya and Flandy Limpele respectively.

Finalists

Amateur era

Open era

Statistics

Multiple champions
Bold indicates active players.

Champions by country

Multiple finalists
Bold indicates active players.Italic indicates players who never won the championship.

See also
 List of Singapore Open men's singles champions
 List of Singapore Open women's singles champions
 List of Singapore Open women's doubles champions
 List of Singapore Open mixed doubles champions

References

External links
Singapore Badminton Association
Badminton Asia

Singapore Open (badminton)